Guildford West is a suburb of Sydney, in the state of New South Wales, Australia that is located 26 kilometres west of the Sydney central business district, in the local government area of the Cumberland City Council and is part of the Greater Western Sydney region. Guildford West shares the postcode of 2161 with the separate suburbs of Guildford and Old Guildford.

Commercial area
Although small in size, Fairfield Road and Fowler Road act as the suburb's 'main streets' with a few restaurants, convenient stores, a post office, a 7-Eleven, a large bar called Crown On McCredie, and a Cheesecake Shop outlet. Fairfield town centre, which features a shopping mall, and the Guildford main street in Guildford Road are equidistant to the residential area of Guildford West, with some areas being more adjacent to the Fairfield town centre, which can be accessed from Fairfield Road, a street which features a few industrial facilities.

Recreational areas
The suburb features large sports grounds such as Guildford West Sportsground and Guildford Tennis Centre. There are number of small suburban parks with playgrounds and sports fields as well throughout the suburb.

Education
Guildford West Public School and as well as a number of preschools are situated within Guildford West. Although not in the suburb, Fairfield High School and Merrylands High School are in close vicinity to the suburb, depending on the residential area.

Population
At the 2016 census, there were 4,916 residents in Guildford West. The median age of residents was 32 years and 23.5%% of people were aged 14 years and under.  58.1% of people were born in Australia. The next most common countries of birth were Lebanon 8.9%, Afghanistan 2.6%, New Zealand 2.4%, Iraq 2.2% and China 2.0%. 44.5% of people spoke only English at home. Other languages spoken at home included Arabic 26.7% and Mandarin 2.1%. 

The top responses for religious affiliation were Catholic 33.3%, Islam 22.1%, No Religion 10.8% and Anglican 8.6%.

References

Suburbs of Sydney
Cumberland Council, New South Wales